Pavol Bellás (born 28 May 1997), is a Slovak professional footballer who plays for SC Kittsee in Austria as a forward.

Club career
He made his professional Fortuna Liga debut for Zemplín Michalovce against Senica on 5 December 2015. He replaced Michal Hamuľak in the 86th minute of the 1-1 tie.

Bellás joined MFK Vranov nad Topľou on loan for the 2018-19 season. The deal was made permanent at the end of the season.

References

External links
 MFK Zemplín Michalovce official profile
 Futbalnet profile
 

1997 births
Living people
Slovak footballers
Slovak expatriate footballers
Association football forwards
MFK Zemplín Michalovce players
FK Slavoj Trebišov players
MFK Tatran Liptovský Mikuláš players
MFK Vranov nad Topľou players
Slovak Super Liga players
2. Liga (Slovakia) players
People from Michalovce
Sportspeople from the Košice Region
Slovak expatriate sportspeople in Austria
Expatriate footballers in Austria